The 2018 Illinois Fighting Illini baseball team represented the University of Illinois during the 2018 NCAA Division I baseball season. The Fighting Illini played their home games at Illinois Field as a member of the Big Ten Conference. They were led by head coach Dan Hartleb, in his 13th season at Illinois.

Personnel

Roster

Reference:

Coaching staff

Reference:

Rankings

References

2018 Big Ten Conference baseball season
Illinois Fighting Illini baseball seasons
Illinois Fighting Illini baseball team